Neonotonia wightii, the perennial soybean, is a species of flowering plant in the family Fabaceae, native to subSaharan Africa, Yemen, India, and Sri Lanka, and widely introduced as a forage in Brazil, Bolivia, Paraguay, northern Argentina, the Mascarene Islands, Peninsular Malaysia, Java, New Guinea, Queensland and New South Wales in Australia, and Fiji. It is shade tolerant.

Subtaxa
The following subtaxa are accepted:
Neonotonia wightii var. longicauda (Schweinf.) J.A.Lackey
Neonotonia wightii var. mearnsii (De Wild.) J.A.Lackey
Neonotonia wightii subsp. petitiana (A.Rich.) J.A.Lackey
Neonotonia wightii subsp. pseudojavanica (Taub.) J.A.Lackey
Neonotonia wightii subsp. wightii

References

Phaseoleae
Forages
Flora of West Tropical Africa
Flora of West-Central Tropical Africa
Flora of Northeast Tropical Africa
Flora of East Tropical Africa
Flora of South Tropical Africa
Flora of Southern Africa
Flora of Yemen
Flora of India (region)
Flora of Sri Lanka
Plants described in 1977